Jaromír Blažek (born 29 December 1972) is a Czech former professional football goalkeeper.

Club career
Born in Brno, Blažek started his career in Slavia Prague, where he got to play his first league games. After two years during which he was mainly used as a substitute, he moved to Dynamo České Budějovice to become the number one goalkeeper there. That 1992–93 season was to be the last of the Czechoslovak First League, and he decided to spend his first season in the new Gambrinus liga with Viktoria Žižkov, which turned out to be a good choice since he won his first title, the national cup. He left after only one year though, moving across Prague to FC Bohemians. They were relegated that year and Blažek, who did not want to spend a year in the Second League, was loaned for one year to his first club Slavia Prague, where again he was a substitute. Since Bohemians regained promotion the same year, he returned there and stayed for three and a half years.

However, while his club was not performing very well, Blažek drew the attention of giants Sparta Prague, transferring there in early 2000 and winning back-to-back titles in 2000 and 2001. He went on loan to rivals Marila Příbram in 2001 but returned after one year. After that, he played almost every single game for Sparta Prague, be it league, cup or Champions League games. It was a very successful period for Blažek as he won four more titles and three national cups.

In 2007, he decided to move abroad and was sold to German club 1. FC Nürnberg, who purchased him as a replacement for Raphael Schäfer who had left for VfB Stuttgart over the summer. Blažek was the number one there but fell sick in April and could not play the end of a season that saw Nürnberg being relegated. In June, it was announced that Blažek was returning to Sparta Prague for the following season. However, on 16 December 2011, Sparta Prague announced their decision to terminate Blažek's contract early, releasing him as a free agent. This was confirmed by the player's agent Pavel Paska.

On 22 February 2014, in a league match for Jihlava against Znojmo, Blažek kept his 139th clean sheet, setting a new goalkeeper record for the Czech league.

International career
Blažek made his debut for the national team on 29 March 2000 in a friendly match against Australia that ended up in a 3–1 win. Due to the dominance of Petr Čech as the first-choice national team goalkeeper, Blažek was unable to make regular appearances for his nation. He was part of the Czech squad at both Euro 2000 and Euro 2004, but only played in one match during the two tournaments combined. He was also named in the Czech squad for the 2006 World Cup.

Personal life
He is married and has two children – Jakub and Aneta. Blažek is the cousin of tennis player Radek Štěpánek.

Career statistics

Club

International
Source:

Honours

Club
Viktoria Žižkov
 Czech Cup: 1994

Slavia Prague
 Czech First League: 1995–96

Bohemians 1905
 Czech Second League: 3rd Place 1997–98
 Czech Second League: 1998–99

Sparta Prague
 Czech First League: 1999–2000, 2000–01, 2002–03, 2004–05, 2006–07
 Czech First League: Runner-up 2003–04, 2008–09, 2010–11
 Czech Cup: 2004, 2006, 2007
 Czech Cup: Runner-up 2001

Vysočina Jihlava
 Czech Second League: Runner-up 2011–12

International
Czech Republic
 UEFA European Championship: Semi-finalist 2004

Individual
Czech First League
 Team of the Year 1999–2000, 2002–03, 2003–04, 2008–09
 Most clean sheets 2002–03, 2006–07, 2009–10, 2010–11
 Best goalkeeper 2012–13
 Second best goalkeeper between the years 1993–2013 by the fans' poll
 Player of the Month: October 2013

Czech Footballer of the Year
 Personality of the League 2005–06

Records
 Czech First League: Oldest player in history of the Czech First League (42 years, 4 months)
 Czech First League: Most clean sheets in history of the Czech First League (157)
 Czech First League: Most played seasons (19)

References

External links
 
 
 
 

1972 births
Living people
Footballers from Brno
Association football goalkeepers
Czech footballers
SK Slavia Prague players
FK Viktoria Žižkov players
AC Sparta Prague players
1. FK Příbram players
SK Dynamo České Budějovice players
1. FC Nürnberg players
FC Vysočina Jihlava players
Czech First League players
Bundesliga players
Czech Republic international footballers
Czech Republic under-21 international footballers
UEFA Euro 2000 players
UEFA Euro 2004 players
2006 FIFA World Cup players
UEFA Euro 2008 players
Czech expatriate footballers
Expatriate footballers in Germany